Wendy Nicholls (born 22 May 1937) is an Australian gymnast. She competed in five events at the 1956 Summer Olympics.

References

1937 births
Living people
Australian female artistic gymnasts
Olympic gymnasts of Australia
Gymnasts at the 1956 Summer Olympics
Place of birth missing (living people)
20th-century Australian women